Flourensia polyclada is a species of flowering plant in the family Asteraceae that was first described by American botanist Sidney Fay Blake. It is a terrestrial plant. It is found in Argentina.

References

Heliantheae
Flora of Argentina